The Lithuanian Special Operations Force (LITHSOF) is a special operation unit of the Lithuanian Armed Forces, formed exclusively of carefully selected, motivated and specially trained professionals. The main tasks of the Special Operations Force are counter terrorism, special reconnaissance, and hostage rescue.

The Lithuanian Special Operations Force has been in operation de facto since 2002 and it was established de jure on April 3, 2008, when amendments of the National Defence System organisation and military service law came into force. SOF is formed from the Special Operations Unit.

Structure and tasks

The structure of the Lithuanian Special Operations Force is flexible which makes it easy to form squadrons intended for specific operations and missions from its elements. It consists of:

  Special Operations Force (SOP - Specialiųjų Operacijų Pajėgos) in Vilnius
  Vytautas the Great Jaeger Battalion (VDJB - Vytauto Didžiojo jėgerių batalionas) in Kaunas. Main tasks: special reconnaissance, direct action, raids, ambushes, terrain blocking, fire support.
  Special Purpose Service (YPT - Ypatingosios paskirties tarnyba) in Vilnius. Main tasks: counter-terrorism, hostage rescue, special operations on land, water and air.
  Combat Divers Service (KNT - Kovinių narų tarnyba) in Klaipėda. Main tasks: special operations in water, boarding operations, coastal reconnaissance, infiltration ashore, special underwater operations and support during hostage situations. The unit can be compared to the United States Navy SEALs or the British Special Boat Service.
  Air Force Special Operations Element (SOG - Specialiųjų operacijų grandis) (operationally subordinated to SOP) in Šiauliai. Main tasks: infiltration and exfiltration, patrolling and aerial reconnaissance, fire support, transporting and medical evacuation.
 Training and Combat Support Center (MKPC - Mokymo ir kovinės paramos centras) in Vilnius.

One of the main missions of the Lithuanian Special Operations Force is counter-terrorism operations beyond the territory of Lithuania.

History

Establishment

Soon after Lithuania re-established its independence from the Soviet Union on March 11, 1990, the need arose to form armed units. One of the first such units was Aukščiausiosios Tarybos Apsaugos Skyrius ("Supreme Council Security Section"). One of the main tasks of this unit was to protect the Lithuanian Parliament. In the following years, the Lithuanian army underwent various restructuring processes. After the reorganization of Kaunas Vytautas the Great motorized infantry battalion in 1995, the separate Vytautas the Great Jaeger Battalion (named after Lithuanian Grand Duke Vytautas the Great) was established, which would become one of the core units of Lithuanian Special Operations Force.

Unofficial formation of the Special Purpose Service was started in 1995; after two more years the Service was officially established. After the 9/11 terror attacks, the main tasks of the Special Purpose Service became counter-terrorism, terrorist liquidation and hostage rescue. Members of the Special Purpose Service are called Žaliukai, meaning green-men and were named after the Forest Brothers.

After a 2007 reorganization, the Combat Divers Service (CDS) was established, whose main task became special underwater and surface operations.

Among the most secretive Lithuanian Special Operations Force units are squadrons referred to by the codename Aitvaras (named after a traditional Lithuanian mythological spirit). The first public acknowledgment of the existence of Specialiųjų Operacijų Junginys (SOJ) "Aitvaras" (Special Operations Unit "Cockatrice") was in 2000, when Lithuanian sailors were captured in Guinea. Aitvaras carries out classified missions.

Operational history 

The Lithuanian Special Operations Force units have participated in a number of missions. 
From 2002 to 2004 squadrons of the Aitvaras were deployed to the "Enduring Freedom" operation in Afghanistan. Preparedness and execution of tasks by the SOF squadrons have been especially noted by the coalition partners.

From 2005 to 2006, the Lithuanian Special Operations Force was on the operational half-year stand-by period in the NATO Response Force. Since the autumn 2007, SOF have taken part in the NATO-led International Security Assistance Force mission in southern Afghanistan. In 2008 soldiers of the SOF continued their service in the NATO Response Force.

In 2017, Lithuanian government has made a decision to send 20 soldiers group to the mission in Medditeranian EU Navfor Med including soldiers from navy forces, land forces and special operations forces. Lithuanian SOF are close friends and partners with US Navy Seals, US Marines, US Green Berets, US Army Rangers, Polish, Latvian, Estonian, German, French, British and Ukrainian SOFs. Alone and together with partners Lithuanian SOF participate in exercises and missions abroad and in Lithuania.

Gallery

See also 
 Military of Lithuania

References 
Specific

General
 Lithuanian Ministry of Defence site

External links 
 Lithuanian Special Operations Force official site
 Video presentation of Lithuanian Special Operations Force
 Video presentation of Vytautas the Great Jaeger Battalion

 
2002 establishments in Lithuania
Military units and formations established in 2002